The Military Ordinariate of Indonesia  is a military ordinariate of the Roman Catholic Church. Immediately subject to the Holy See, it provides pastoral care to Roman Catholics serving in the Indonesian National Armed Forces and Indonesian National Police and their families.

History
It was established as a military vicariate on 25 December 1949 and elevated to a military ordinariate on 21 July 1986.

Office holders

Military vicars
 Albert Soegijapranata, S.J. (appointed 1949 – died 23 July 1963)
 Justinus Darmojuwono (appointed 8 July 1964 – retired 31 December 1983)
 Julius Riyadi Darmaatmadja, S.J. (appointed 28 April 1984 – became military ordinary 21 July 1986)

Military ordinaries
 Julius Riyadi Darmaatmadja, S.J. (appointed 21 July 1986 – resigned 2 January 2006)
 Ignatius Suharyo Hardjoatmodjo (incumbent, appointed 2 January 2006)

References

External Links 
 Military Ordinariate of Indonesia (Catholic-Hierarchy)
 Military Ordinariate of Indonesia (GCatholic.org)

Indonesia
Indonesia
1949 establishments in Indonesia